Bobigny–Pablo Picasso is the northern terminus of Line 5 of the Paris Métro, as well as a stop on Île-de-France tramway Line 1. Also, it will be a station on Paris Metro Line 15 in the future. The metro station was opened in 1985, followed by the tram stop seven years later.

The name refers to the commune of Bobigny and to Rue Pablo Picasso, named after the Spanish modern artist Pablo Picasso. In 2013, the station was used by 7,135,266 passengers, which makes it the 38th busiest of the Métro network, out of 302 stations.

In 2020, the station was used by 4,752,569 passengers amidst the COVID-19 pandemic, making it the 20th busiest of the Métro network, out of 305 stations.

Passenger services

Access 
The station has 4 entrances:

 Access 1: Hôtel de Ville
 Access 2: Palais de Justice
 Access 3: Rue Carnot
 Access 4: Prefecture

Station layout

Platforms
The station has, as does Porte de Pantin located on the same line, a particular arrangement specific to the stations serving or had served as a terminus. It has three tracks and two platforms. The side platform serves as the arrival platform while the island platform serves as the departure platform. The walls are flush with the platforms and are vertical, with the roof of the station being straight without metal panels, unlike other stations on the network.

A turnback exists 160 meters beyond the station under the rue Pablo-Picasso to allow for trains to reverse due to its role as the terminus.

Other connections
Since 6 July 1992, the station has been served by tramway T1, and before the extension to Noisy-le-Sec station on 15 December 2003, was its eastern terminus.

A bus station is located above the station and offers connections with lines 146, 148, 234, 251, 301, 303 and 322 of the RATP Bus Network, with lines 615 and 620 of the Transdev TRA bus network, with line 93 of the CIF bus network, with line 8 of the Trans Val de France bus network and, at night, with lines N13, N41, and N45 of the Noctilien network.

Gallery

References

Roland, Gérard (2003). Stations de métro. D'Abbesses à Wagram. Éditions Bonneton.

Paris Métro stations in Bobigny
Railway stations in France opened in 1985